Budkiya is a village in the dechu tehsil of Jodhpur District in Rajasthan, India. It is also called Marwar Budkiya. According to 2011 census, it has population is 2761.

References

Villages in Jodhpur district